The Polish Cycling Federation or PZKol (in Polish: Polski Związek Kolarski) is the national governing body of cycle racing in Poland.

The PZK is a member of the UCI and the UEC. It is based at the BGŻ Arena in Pruszków.

See also
Polish records in track cycling

External links
 Polish Cycling Federation official website

Cycle racing organizations
Pruszków County
National members of the European Cycling Union
Cycling
Cycle racing in Poland